Events from the year 1988 in Venezuela

Incumbents  
 President: Jaime Lusinchi  
 Vice-President: none - title in abeyance

Events 
 October 29 – Massacre of El Amparo: 14 fishermen are killed by a joint military-police unit.
 December 4 – In the 1988 Venezuelan general election, Carlos Andrés Pérez of Democratic Action is elected president with 52.9% of the vote, while Democratic Action win the most seats in the Chamber of Deputies and Senate, on a turnout of 81.9% in the presidential election and 81.7% in the Congressional elections.

Births 
 February 8 – Andreína Tarazón, politician
 June 8 – Reinaldo Zavarce, actor and singer
 October 26 – Nosliw Rodríguez, politician
 Yendri Sánchez, known for breaking into public acts of various personalities

Deaths 
 November 26 – Antonio Estévez, composer (b. 1916)

References